Great Trough Creek is a tributary of the Raystown Branch Juniata River in Bedford, Fulton and Huntingdon counties in Pennsylvania in the United States.

Bridges
The Baker Bridge crosses Great Trough Creek at Todd Township, Huntingdon County, Pennsylvania.

See also
List of rivers of Pennsylvania

References

Rivers of Pennsylvania
Tributaries of the Juniata River
Rivers of Bedford County, Pennsylvania
Rivers of Fulton County, Pennsylvania
Rivers of Huntingdon County, Pennsylvania